Lawrence E. Kahn (born December 8, 1937) is a senior United States district judge of the United States District Court for the Northern District of New York.

Education and career

Born in Troy, New York, Kahn graduated from Union College with an Artium Baccalaureus degree in 1959 and Harvard Law School with a Juris Doctor in 1962. He studied at Oxford University and then practiced law with his brother in Albany, New York, from 1963 to 1973. Originally a Democrat allied with Daniel P. O'Connell and Erastus Corning 2nd, Kahn was Albany's Assistant Corporation Counsel from 1963 to 1968. After the Democratic Party in Albany County was not receptive to his desire to become a judge, Kahn switched parties.  As a Republican he served as Albany County Surrogate Court Judge from 1973 to 1979. In 1980 Kahn became a justice of the New York Supreme Court, and he served until 1996.

Federal judicial service

He was nominated to the United States District Court for the Northern District of New York by President Bill Clinton on April 18, 1996, to the seat vacated by Neal Peters McCurn. He was confirmed by the United States Senate on July 16, 1996 and received his commission on August 1, 1996. Kahn assumed senior status on August 1, 2007.

Sources

John Caher, Albany Times Union, State Jurist may Land Seat on Federal Bench, August 10, 1995
U.S. Government Printing Office, Confirmation Hearings on Federal Appointments, Part 3, 1996, page 925

1937 births
Living people
Union College (New York) alumni
Harvard Law School alumni
New York (state) Democrats
New York (state) Republicans
New York (state) lawyers
New York (state) state court judges
New York Supreme Court Justices
Judges of the United States District Court for the Northern District of New York
United States district court judges appointed by Bill Clinton
People from Troy, New York
20th-century American judges
21st-century American judges
Alumni of the University of Oxford